Jim Jabir is an American basketball coach at the college level and formerly at the professional level.

Career 
A native of Brooklyn, New York, Jabir graduated from Nazareth College in 1984 with a degree in English. He began his coaching career as an assistant at Nazareth in 1984–85. He was the Head Coach of Buffalo State College in the NCAA Division 3 in 1986–87, guiding the team to a SUNYAC Championship and the NCAA Regionals. At Buffalo State, he earned a Master's degree in Student Personnel Administration.

At age 24, Jabir was named Head Women’s Basketball Coach at Siena College. Between 1987 and 1990, he had a record of 50–29 at Siena, followed by head coaching stints at Marquette University (1990–1996) and Providence College (1996–2002). He guided Marquette Women’s Basketball Team to NCAA Tournament appearances in 1994 and 1995, Jabir earned Reebok/Great Midwest Coach of the Year honors twice. During his tenure at Providence, he led the Women’s team to 62 wins and 102 losses.

In 2002–03, Jabir was an assistant coach at the Colorado University Women’s Basketball Team, helping the squad to a Sweet 16 appearance. Jabir moved to the University of Dayton, where he was the Head Women’s Basketball Coach from 2003 to 2016. At Dayton, he compiled a record of 252 wins and 155 defeats and became the winningest coach in program history. In 2013, his Dayton Flyers’ team was ranked 11th nationally in the Associated Press and USA Today Coaches polls. He coached Dayton to the NCAA Elite Eight in 2015. Jabir received Atlantic 10 Coach of the Year honors in 2008 and 2013 and was a finalist for the Naismith College Coach of the Year Award in 2013. On September 7, 2016, Jabir stepped back for health reasons. Jabir said, he has had heart problems in the past and a pacemaker and defibrillator.

In parts of the 2016–17 season, he coached in the professional ranks, serving as head coach for SISU's men's team in Denmark’s Basketligaen, where he signed in January 2017. He guided the team to a semifinal appearance and was named 2016–17 Basketligaen Coach of the Year. Under his guidance, SISU won eleven of its 18 games.

Jabir went back to the United States and was Head Women's Basketball Coach at Florida Atlantic University from 2017 to 2021. In April 2021, he returned to Siena College and was named Siena’s Women's Basketball Head Coach.

Head coaching record

'

'

'

'

References 

Living people
American expatriate sportspeople in Denmark
Marquette Golden Eagles women's basketball coaches
Providence Friars women's basketball coaches
Dayton Flyers women's basketball coaches
Florida Atlantic Owls women's basketball coaches
Siena Saints women's basketball coaches
Basketball people from New York (state)
1962 births
Buffalo State Bengals